This is a partial list of artworks produced by Pablo Picasso from 1961 to 1970.

1961, The Dance of Youth
1961, Les Freres Sole
1961, Jacqueline
1961, Luncheon on the Grass
1962, Côte d'Azur
1962 Jacqueline au ruban jaune (Jacqueline with a Yellow Ribbon), cut and painted sheet metal, National Gallery of Iceland, Reykjavík, Iceland.
1962, Bust of a Woman with a Hat (Private Collection)
1962, Femme au Chien, Wynn Fine Art, Florida
1963, Nu assis dans un fauteuil  (See the picture and description here)
1963, Man and Woman, etching, aquatint and drypoint on paper, University of Michigan Museum of Art
1963, Le Peintre, destroyed in 1998 in the crash of Swissair Flight 111.
1964, The Smoker, Aquatint on paper.
1966, Woman with Bird, aquatint on paper, University of Michigan Museum of Art
1966, Artist in His Studio (L'atelier de l'artiste), aquatint, etching and drypoint on paper, University of Michigan Museum of Art
1967, 15 August, the Chicago Picasso is unveiled at Chicago's Richard J. Daley Center Plaza.
1967, Femme nue à l'oiseau et joueur de flûte  (See the picture and description here)
1967, Woman and Musketeer, oil on canvas, Metropolitan Museum of Art
1968, Standing Nude and Seated Musketeer, oil on canvas, Metropolitan Museum of Art
1968, Etreinte (The Embrace), etching on paper, University of Michigan Museum of Art
1968, Homme Arretant un Cheval Devant une Femme, etching and aquatint
1968, Homme et femme nus, Painted in Mougins on 13 November 1968
1969, Man with the Golden Helmet
1969, The Kiss
1969, El Toro 
1969,  Toro Y Toreros
1969,  El Buho
1970, The Matador
1970, The Fisherman, Regjeringskvartalet, Oslo, Norway.
1970, Young Spanish Peasant, color lithograph

References

1961-1970
Picasso 1961-1970
1960s in art